Psychotria carronis, commonly known as the black grape, is a flowering plant in the coffee family. The specific epithet honours William Carron (1823–1876) who collected plants on Lord Howe Island for the Royal Botanic Gardens, Sydney.

Description
It is a small tree growing to 8 m in height. The stems exhibit prominent ring-like leaf scars. The dark glossy green, oblong-oblanceolate leaves are 80–160 mm long, 30–50 mm wide. The white flowers, 6–8 mm long, occur in cymose inflorescences from November to March. The shiny, fleshy, black fruits are 18–20 mm long and are produced in loose clusters.

Distribution and habitat
The species is endemic to Australia’s subtropical Lord Howe Island in the Tasman Sea. It occurs in sheltered forest, mainly at elevations of 100–400 m, around Mounts Lidgbird and Gower at the southern end of the island.

References

carronis
Endemic flora of Lord Howe Island
Plants described in 1869
Gentianales of Australia
Taxa named by Ferdinand von Mueller
Taxa named by Charles Moore